Acacia sabulosa is a shrub of the genus Acacia and the subgenus Phyllodineae that is endemic to north western Australia.

Description
It has smooth dark grey coloured bark that becomes fissured at the base with age. The slender, yellow to light brown coloured branchelt have bright green new shoots. Like most species of Acacia it has phyllodes rather than true leaves. It blooms from May to July and produces yellow flowers.

Distribution
It is native to an area in the Northern Territory and the Goldfields-Esperance and Pilbara regions of Western Australia. It usually grows in sand dunes around the Eremaean Province and Northern Province with very arid landscapes and red brown coloured sandy soils. The shrub has a discontinuous distribution within the Pilbara region from coastal areas between Port Hedland and Cossack in the west to Marble Bar and Shay Gap, Western Australia. It also occurs further north from around Mandora extending eastward to the Great Sandy Desert and the Little Sandy Desert. It also located in the Northern Territory in the Tanami Desert where it is often a part of spinifex communities.

See also
 List of Acacia species

References

sabulosa
Acacias of Western Australia
Flora of the Northern Territory
Taxa named by Bruce Maslin
Plants described in 1999